The 4.38×30mm Libra (.17 Libra) is a centerfire cartridge designed for use in personal defense weapons.

Description
It was designed and has been manufactured by ČZW for use in their ČZW-438 PDW.

The cartridge is based on a .22 Hornet cartridge converted to a rimless design and necked down to .17 calibre.

Variants
 .17 Libra [4.38×30mm]: A rimless varmint-hunting and sport-shooting cartridge
 .17 Rimmed Libra [4.38×30mmR]: A rimmed varmint-hunting and sport-shooting cartridge for use with break-open actions
 .17 Libra Magnum [unknown]: A longer, more powerful rimless round for use in pistols or personal defense weapons

See also
4 mm caliber

References

Pistol and rifle cartridges